Maria Jolanta Kazanecka-Górecka (born 29 August 1955 in Poznań) is a Polish sprint canoeist who competed in the mid-1970s. She won a bronze medal in the K-2 500 m event at the 1975 ICF Canoe Sprint World Championships in Belgrade.

Kazanecka also finished sixth in the K-2 500 m event at the 1976 Summer Olympics in Montreal.

Her husband, Kazimierz (1954–77), also competed as a sprint canoer in the 1970s.

References

Sports-reference.com profile.

1955 births
Canoeists at the 1976 Summer Olympics
Living people
Olympic canoeists of Poland
Polish female canoeists
Sportspeople from Poznań
ICF Canoe Sprint World Championships medalists in kayak
20th-century Polish women